KPDQ-FM (93.9 MHz) is a commercial FM radio station in Portland, Oregon.  It is owned by Salem Communications and serves the Portland metropolitan area, with a Christian talk and teaching radio format.  The studios and offices are on SE Lake Road in Portland.  KPDQ-FM is co-owned with KPDQ, also a Christian talk and teaching station.  Each station runs its own schedule.  Among the religious leaders heard on KPDQ-FM are Chuck Swindoll, Dr. David Jeremiah, Jim Daly, Dr. Tony Evans and John MacArthur.  Hosts pay Salem Media for time on the station and may use their broadcasts to appeal for donations to their ministries.

KPDQ-FM has an effective radiated power (ERP) of 50,000 watts (52,000 with beam tilt).  The main transmitter is atop Portland's west hills, off SW Fairmount Court.  In addition, KPDQ-FM is heard on four FM translator stations, to improve reception in other Oregon communities.

History

Early years
KPDQ-FM signed on the air on October 8, 1961, originally at 93.7 MHz.   At first, it simulcasted the same religious programming heard on co-owned KPDQ (AM 800), which originally was a daytimer, required to sign off at sunset.  In the 1970s, KPDQ-FM began airing separate religious programming.  KPDQ-FM was owned by George W. Davis, who had founded KPDQ in 1947.

In the 1980s, Davis' son, George Davis II, became the president of the Inspirational Broadcasting Corporation, the new name for the company that owned both stations.  In August 1986, Inspirational Broadcasting sold KPDQ-AM-FM to Salem Media.

Frequency switch
In early 2006, KPDQ-FM moved one spot up the dial, to 93.9 MHz.  It was part of a multi-station switch, with KAST-FM in Astoria permitted to move into the Portland radio market.  That station is now Regional Mexican-formatted KRYP (licensed to Gladstone), also owned by Salem Media.

As part of the move, KPDQ-FM had to downgrade from Class C to Class C1.  In addition, it had to cut its 97,000 watt output nearly in half.

See also
List of radio stations in Washington

References

External links
KPDQ-FM Website

PDQ-FM
PDQ-FM
Radio stations established in 1961
1961 establishments in Oregon
Salem Media Group properties